Richard Felix Wallace (July 22, 1882 – July 19, 1925) was an American baseball shortstop and manager in the Negro leagues. He played from 1903 to 1924 with several teams, including the Lincoln Giants and the St. Louis Giants. He was Captain of the St. Louis Giants in 1912. He managed from 1909 to 1921.

Born in Owensboro, Kentucky, Wallace started his baseball career in 1903, playing for the Paducah Nationals of Paducah, Kentucky where he stayed until the end of the 1905 season.

In 1906 and 1907, Wallace played for the Cuban Giants of New York City.

In 1908 and 1909 he joined the St. Paul Colored Gophers, playing second base.

At the end of the 1909 year, he joined the Leland Giants at second base where he also made two hits against Chicago Cubs pitcher Ray Brown.

Sportswriter and fellow player Jimmy Smith put Wallace on his 1909 "All American Team."

A court battle split the Leland Giants in 1910. Harris went to the Chicago Giants and played there in 1910.

Wallace would continue his career, mostly passing between the Lincoln Giants and the St. Louis Giants where he worked as a player/manager, finishing his playing career with the Brooklyn Royal Giants and finally the Hilldale Daisies in 1919.

Wallace continued to manage the St. Louis Giants until the end of the 1921 season.

He died July 19, 1925 at 42 years old in Owensboro, KY.

References

External links
 and Baseball-Reference Black Baseball stats and Seamheads
  and Seamheads

1882 births
1925 deaths
Negro league baseball managers
Bacharach Giants players
Brooklyn Royal Giants players
Chicago Giants players
Cuban Giants players
Hilldale Club players
Lincoln Giants players
St. Louis Giants players
St. Louis Giants (1924) players
St. Paul Colored Gophers players
20th-century African-American people